Hamida Addèche (born 14 June 1932) is a French long-distance runner. He competed in the men's 10,000 metres at the 1960 Summer Olympics.

References

External links
 

1932 births
Living people
Athletes (track and field) at the 1960 Summer Olympics
French male long-distance runners
Olympic athletes of France
20th-century French people